Tataurov Pochinok is a rural locality (a village) in Pelshemskoye Rural Settlement, Sokolsky District, Vologda Oblast, Russia. The population was 2 as of 2002.

Geography 
Tataurov Pochinok is located 49 km southeast of Sokol (the district's administrative centre) by road. Berezov Pochinok is the nearest rural locality.

References 

Rural localities in Sokolsky District, Vologda Oblast